A Pancoast tumor is a tumor of the apex of the lung. It is a type of lung cancer defined primarily by its location situated at the top end of either the right or left lung. It typically spreads to nearby tissues such as the ribs and vertebrae. Most Pancoast tumors are non-small-cell lung cancers.

The growing tumor can cause compression of a brachiocephalic vein, subclavian artery, phrenic nerve, recurrent laryngeal nerve, vagus nerve, or, characteristically, compression of a sympathetic ganglion (the stellate ganglion), resulting in a range of symptoms known as Horner's syndrome.

Pancoast tumors are named for Henry Pancoast, an American radiologist, who described them in 1924 and 1932.

Signs and symptoms
Aside from constitutional symptoms of cancer such as malaise, fever, weight loss and fatigue, Pancoast tumor can include a complete Horner's syndrome in severe cases: miosis (constriction of the pupils), anhidrosis (lack of sweating), ptosis (drooping of the eyelid), and pseudoenophthalmos (as a result of the ptosis). In progressive cases, the brachial plexus is also affected, causing pain and weakness in the muscles of the arm and hand with a symptomatology typical of thoracic outlet syndrome. The tumor can also compress the recurrent laryngeal nerve and from this a hoarse voice and "bovine" (non-explosive) cough may occur.

In superior vena cava syndrome, obstruction of the superior vena cava by a tumor (mass effect) causes facial swelling cyanosis and dilatation of the veins of the head and neck.

A Pancoast tumor is an apical tumor that is typically found in conjunction with a history of smoking tobacco. The clinical signs and symptoms may be mistaken for neurovascular compromise at the level of the superior thoracic aperture. The patient's smoking history, rapid onset of clinical signs and symptoms, and pleuritic pain can suggest an apical tumor. A Pancoast tumor can give rise to both Pancoast syndrome and Horner's syndrome. When the brachial plexus roots are involved, it will produce Pancoast syndrome; involvement of sympathetic fibers as they exit the cord at T1 and ascend to the superior cervical ganglion will produce Horner's syndrome.

Diagnosis
Diagnosis of Pancoast tumor is usually made after evaluating clinical symptoms and imaging. Chest X-ray is a good screening test even though a CT scan of the chest can provide a better resolution and extent to which internal organs are being compressed.

Treatment

The treatment of a Pancoast lung cancer may differ from that of other types of non-small-cell lung cancer. Its position and close proximity to vital structures (such as nerves and the spine) may make surgical intervention difficult.  As a result, and depending on the stage of the cancer, treatment may involve radiation therapy and chemotherapy given prior to surgery (neoadjuvant treatment).
Surgery may consist of the removal of the upper lobe of a lung together with its associated structures (subclavian artery, vein, branches of the brachial plexus, ribs and vertebral bodies), as well as mediastinal lymphadenectomy. Surgical access may be via thoracotomy from the back or the front of the chest and modifications. Nonsurgical treatment may consist of radiation therapy alone or clinical trials of new combinations of treatment.

References

External links 

 Pulmonary sulcus tumor entry in the public domain NCI Dictionary of Cancer Terms

Lung cancer
Syndromes affecting the lung